The following list of publications by Richard Dawkins is a chronological list of papers, articles, essays and books published by British ethologist and evolutionary biologist Richard Dawkins.

He has also written many book reviews and newspaper articles which are not listed on this page.

Books

Popular articles

Academic papers

1960s

1970s

1980s

1990s

2000s

Forewords 

Richard Dawkins has also written forewords to books, including:
 Red Strangers by Elspeth Huxley, republished by Penguin Books, 1999.
 The Meme Machine by Susan Blackmore, Oxford University Press, 1999.
 Pyramids of Life by Harvey Croze and John Reader, Harvill Press, 2000.
 Snake Oil and Other Preoccupations by John Diamond, Vintage, 2001.
 The Lion Children, by Angus, Maisie and Travers McNeice, Orion Books, 2001.
 A new student edition of Charles Darwin's The Descent of Man, Gibson Square Books, 2002.
 A Thousand Brains: A New Theory of Intelligence by Jeff Hawkins, Basic Books, 2021

References 

 
Lists of publications
Bibliographies by writer